Chris Van Etten is an American television soap opera writer from Rochester, New York.

On July 29, 2017, Van Etten was promoted to co-head writer on the ABC soap opera General Hospital, replacing Jean Passanante.

He has also created with writing partners are David Ozanich and David Levithan; they collaborated on the young adult novel series Likely Story for Random House.

Positions held
General Hospital
Breakdown Writer (May 10, 2012 – October 6, 2017)
Co-Head Writer (October 9, 2017 – present)

One Life to Live
Breakdown Writer (November 8, 2006 - February 22, 2008; May 2, 2008 - January 13, 2012)
Occasional Associate Head Writer (August 15, 2005 - November 2006)
Continuity Supervisor (2004)
Writers' Associate (2003)
Assistant to the Executive Producer (January 2001 - 2003)

Awards and nominations

Daytime Emmy Award
Nomination, 2009, Best Writing, One Life to Live

Daytime Emmy Award
Win, 2008, Best Writing, One Life to Live
Nomination, 2006, Best Writing, One Life to Live

Writers Guild of America Award
Nomination, 2005, Best Writing, One Life to Live

Works 
Likely Story, co-written with David Levithan and David Ozanich (2010)
All That Glitters, co-written with David Levithan and David Ozanich (2008)
Red Carpet Riot, co-written with David Levithan and David Ozanich (2009)

Head writer history

References

American soap opera writers
American male television writers
Year of birth missing (living people)
Living people